Gabrielle Moraes Da Silva (born ) is a Brazilian group rhythmic gymnast. She represents her nation at international competitions. She competed at world championships, including at the 2014 World Rhythmic Gymnastics Championships.

In 2013, Gabrielle da Silva and the other members of the Brazilian group — Beatriz Pomini, Bianca Mendonça, Debora Falda, Francielly Pereira and Eliane Sampaio — earned the bronze medal on the 3 balls + 2 ribbons routine at the Minsk stage of the 2013 Rhythmic Gymnastics World Cup Series. This was not only Brazil's but also Latin America's first medal at the Rhythmic Gymnastics World Cup series, and only the second time a country from the Americas earned a medal at the World Cup, after Canada's Mary Fuzesi earned the bronze medal on ribbon at the 1990 FIG World Cup Final.

See also
List of Olympic rhythmic gymnasts for Brazil

References

1997 births
Living people
Brazilian rhythmic gymnasts
Place of birth missing (living people)
Olympic gymnasts of Brazil
South American Games gold medalists for Brazil
South American Games medalists in gymnastics
Competitors at the 2018 South American Games
Gymnasts at the 2016 Summer Olympics
Sportspeople from Paraná (state)
21st-century Brazilian women